Guy Gross is an Australian film and television composer. He is known most for writing the award-winning music for the Australian science fiction series Farscape and the international hit film The Adventures of Priscilla, Queen of the Desert. He also composed for the animated television series Blinky Bill and Dumb Bunnies. He has 76 credits as screen composer.

Personal
Gross began film scoring while studying classical composition at the Conservatorium High School in Sydney, Australia. He is the son of film producers Yoram and Sandra Gross. Gross composed music for the family animation business in High School.

Gross was a partner and a director of Trackdown Digital, an Australian film music and audio recording center and is now part of the Church Street Studios collective. From 2012 to 2017 he was President of the Australian Guild of Screen Composers.

Filmography
Guy Gross (IMDb)
 Composer (76 credits)
 Music Department (8 credits)
 Director (3 credits)
 Soundtrack (9 credits)
 Writer (2 credits)
 Actor (1 credit)
 Camera and Electrical Department (1 credit)
 Sound Department (1 credit)

Films
 2018
 Swinging Safari (composer)
 2017
 BABA (Short) (composer)
 2016
 I Wandering Soul (Short)
 Library of Love (Short)
 2015
 Bluey (Short)
 The Longest War: The Australian Army in Afghanistan (Documentary)
 2014
 Flat Daddy (Short)
 Tango Underpants (Short)
 2013
 The Landing (Short)
 Larrikin Lad (Documentary) (original music by)
 The Turning (segment "Sand")
 2012
 Perception (Short)
 Dream Island (Short)
 The First Fagin (Documentary)
 2011
 Blinky & Me (Documentary)
 Dancing with Dictators: The Story of the Last Foreign Publisher in Burma (Documentary)
 A Few Best Men, A Few Best Men (soundtrack)
 A Heartbeat Away
 The Making of I, Spry (Video documentary short)
 2009
 Lost in Flanders (Video documentary)
 True Crime: A Model Daughter (TV Movie)
 Fat Chance (Documentary)
 Fairweather Man (Documentary)
 2008
 Hey, Hey, It's Esther Blueburger
 2006
 Final Call (Short)
 2005
 Amorality Tale (Short)
 2003
 Silent Storm (Documentary)
 2000
 Uncle Chatzkel (Documentary)
 Cut
 1998
 That's the Way I Like It
Forever Fever
 1997
 Welcome to Woop Woop
 1994
 The Adventures of Priscilla, Queen of the Desert
 1993
 Frauds
 1992
 Blinky Bill: The Mischievous Koala
 1991
 The Magic Riddle
 When Ships Draw Near (Short)
 1987
 Dot and the Smugglers
 Dot Goes to Hollywood
 1986
 Dot and the Whale
 1985
 Epic

Television
 2017
 Pulse (TV Series) (8 episodes)
 Oh Yuck! (TV Series) (26 episodes)
 2014
 Shark Girl (TV Movie documentary)
 Taking on the Chocolate Frog (TV Mini-Series documentary)
 Sam Fox: Extreme Adventures (TV Series) (8 episodes)
 2012
 Raising the Curtain (TV Series documentary)
 Dangerous Remedy (TV Movie)
 2010
 I, Spry (TV Movie)
 2009
 Lost in Flanders (Video documentary)
 True Crime: A Model Daughter (TV Movie)
 2008–2009
 Dex Hamilton: Alien Entomologist (TV Series) (26 episodes)
 2008
 The Prime Minister Is Missing (TV Movie)
 Scorched (TV Movie)
 Resistance (TV Series) (1 episode)
 2007–2011
 East West 101 (TV Series) (20 episodes)
 2007
 Murder in the Outback (TV Movie)
 2006
 Who Killed Dr Bogle and Mrs Chandler? (TV Movie documentary)
 2005
 Tabaluga and Leo
 Blinky Bill's White Christmas
 Flipper & Lopaka: The Search for Neptune's Trident (TV Series) (1 episode)
 The Birth of a Queen: Directing a Drag Classic – The Adventures of Priscilla, Queen of the Desert (Video documentary short)
 2004
 Farscape: The Peacekeeper Wars (TV Mini-Series) (2 episodes)
 Blinky Bill's Extraordinary Balloon Adventure (TV Series)
 2002
 Seconds to Spare (TV Movie)
 2001
 Old Tom (TV Series)
 2000–2003
 Farscape (TV Series) (58 episodes)
 1999
 Flipper & Lopaka (TV Series) (2 episodes)
 1998
 The Dumb Bunnies (TV Series)
 1997
 Fallen Angels (TV Series) (20 episodes)
 1997–1998
 Skippy: Adventures in Bushtown (TV Series) (2 episodes)
 1996
 Big Bag (TV Series) (segment "Samuel & Nina", 1996)
 McLeod's Daughters (TV Movie)
 1995
 Bordertown (TV Mini-Series)
 Blinky Bill's Extraordinary Excursion (TV Series) (1 episode)
 1993
 The Adventures of Blinky Bill (TV Series)
 1994
 House of Fun (TV Series)
 1992
 The Resting Place (TV Short)
 1987
 The Adventures of Candy Claus (TV Short)

Notable awards

ARIA Music Awards
The ARIA Music Awards is an annual awards ceremony that recognises excellence, innovation, and achievement across all genres of Australian music. They commenced in 1987. 

! 
|-
| 1995
| The Priscilla Companion Original Score
| Best Original Soundtrack, Cast or Show Album
| 
|
|-

 In 1994 he was nominated for an Australian Film Institute Award in the Best Original Music Score category for his score for The Adventures of Priscilla, Queen of the Desert.
 In 1995, he was nominated for the British Academy of Film and Television Arts' Anthony Asquith Award for Original Film Music for The Adventures of Priscilla, Queen of the Desert.
 In 2001 he won the Australian Screen Music Award for achievement in Film music for his score for Farscape.
 In 2002 he won the Screen Music Award for Best Music for a Television Series for his score for Farscape.
 In 2009 he won the International Achievement Award (a Screen Music Award) from the Australasian Performing Right Association and the Australian Guild of Screen Composers. In the same year he won another Screen Music Award in the category Best Music for Children's Television for his score for Dex Hamilton: Alien Entomologist

References

External links
 Official site
 Guy Gross (IMDb) IMDb

APRA Award winners
Australian film score composers
Australian people of Israeli descent
Australian people of Polish-Jewish descent
Living people
Male film score composers
Musicians from Sydney
Place of birth missing (living people)
Year of birth missing (living people)
La-La Land Records artists
Blinky Bill